The 1983 Australian Football Championships was an Australian football series between representative teams of the three major football states. Games involving Victoria were played under State of Origin rules, whilst the match between Western Australia and South Australia involved players based in their respective states at the time. The competition was won by Western Australia.

Results

Game 1 

|- style="background:#ccf;"
| Home team
| Home team score
| Away team
| Away team score
| Ground
| Crowd
| Date
| Time
| Broadcast Network
|- style="background:#fff;"
| South Australia
| 26.16 (172)
| Victoria
| 17.14 (116)
| Football Park
| 42,521
| 16 May 1983 
|
| Seven

 Fos Williams Medal: Michael Aish (South Australia)

Game 2 

|- style="background:#ccf;"
| Home team
| Home team score
| Away team
| Away team score
| Ground
| Crowd
| Date
| Time
| Broadcast Network
|- style="background:#fff;"
| Western Australia
| 20.14 (134)
| South Australia
| 16.14 (110)
| Subiaco Oval
|
| 4 June 1983
|
|Seven

 Simpson Medal: Stephen Michael (Western Australia)
 Fos Williams Medal: Craig Williams (South Australia)

Game 3 

|- style="background:#ccf;"
| Home team
| Home team score
| Away team
| Away team score
| Ground
| Crowd
| Date
| Time
| Broadcast Network
|- style="background:#fff;"
| Western Australia
| 16.22 (118)
| Victoria
| 16.19 (115)
| Subiaco Oval
| 44,213
| 12 July 1983 
|
| Seven

 Simpson Medal: Maurice Rioli (Western Australia)
 Tassie Medal: Stephen Michael (Western Australia)

Standings

All-Australian Team 
Following completion of the series, the best players over the three games were selected in the All-Australian team.

Squads

References 

Australian rules interstate football
1983 in Australian rules football